Coz may refer to:

 Claude Le Coz (1740-1815), French Catholic bishop
 Coz Kerrigan (21st century), British musician
 David Gutiérrez de Coz (born 1980), Spanish football (soccer) defender
 Cozumel, Mexico

See also
 Because (disambiguation)